The Good Fence (romanized: HaGader HaTova, romanized: as-Siyaj al-Jayid) was a term that referred to  Israel's mountainous 80-mile northern border with Lebanon during the period following the 1978 South Lebanon conflict (during Lebanese Civil War). At the time, southern Lebanon was controlled by the Maronite Christian militias and the South Lebanon Army, as the Free Lebanon State (1978–1984) and later the South Lebanon security belt administration.

Background
From the 1948 establishment of the State of Israel until 1970, Israel's border with Lebanon was quiet to the point that farmers from the Israeli town of Metula farmed their lands in the Ayoun Valley inside Lebanon. In 1970, after their expulsion from Jordan during Black September, the PLO began taking control over southern Lebanon and violating the tranquility that had prevailed in the area.

History
The beginning of the Good Fence coincides with the beginning of the civil war in Lebanon in 1976 and Israeli support for the predominantly-Maronite militias in southern Lebanon in their battle with the PLO. From 1977, Israel allowed the Maronites and their allies to find employment in Israel and provided assistance in exporting their goods through the Israeli port city of Haifa. The main border crossing through which goods and workers crossed was the Fatima Gate crossing near Metula. This provided essential economic stability to the administration of the Free Lebanon State and the later South Lebanon security belt administration.

Israel states that before 2000, approximately one-third of the ophthalmology patients at Western Galilee Hospital were Lebanese who crossed the border through the Good Fence and received treatment free of charge.  

The Good Fence ceased to exist with Israel's withdrawal from southern Lebanon in 2000 and disintegration of the South Lebanon security belt administration and the SLA militia.

See also

Arab states–Israeli alliance against Iran

References

1977 establishments in Asia
2000 disestablishments in Asia
Lebanese Civil War
South Lebanon conflict (1985–2000)
Israel–Lebanon border
Military alliances involving Israel
Military alliances involving Lebanon